Lebanon Township is one of six townships in Durham County, North Carolina, United States. The township had a population of 16,415 according to the 2000 census.

Geographically, Lebanon Township occupies  in northwestern Durham County.  The township is occupied by small portions of the city of Durham.

Popular roads in Lebanon include Russell and Guess. 3 country clubs are located in Lebanon.

External links
Official site

Townships in Durham County, North Carolina
Townships in North Carolina